Income taxes are the most significant form of taxation in Australia, and collected by the federal government through the Australian Taxation Office. Australian GST revenue is collected by the Federal government, and then paid to the states under a distribution formula determined by the Commonwealth Grants Commission.

Australia maintains a relatively low tax burden in comparison with other wealthy, developed nations, at 27.8% of GDP in 2018.

History

When the first Governor, Governor Phillip, arrived in New South Wales in 1788, he had a Royal Instruction that gave him power to impose taxation if the colony needed it. The first taxes in Australia were raised to help pay for the completion of Sydney's first gaol and provide for the orphans of the colony. Import duties were put on spirits, wine and beer and later on luxury goods.

After 1824 the Government of New South Wales raised extra revenue from customs and excise duties. These were the most important sources of revenue for the colony throughout the 19th century. Taxes were raised on spirits, beer, tobacco, cigars and cigarettes. These taxes would vary between each of the Australian colonies, and this state of affairs remained in place after the colonies achieved statehood.

Thomas de la Condamine was appointed as the first Collector of the Internal Revenue on 7 April 1827 with the actual office of the Collector of the Internal Revenue established on 1 May 1827 by Governor Ralph Darling. When de la Condamine's appointment was not confirmed by the Secretary of State for War and the Colonies William Huskisson, the duties fell to James Busby who held the position until December 1835 when the position was filled by William McPhereson. The Collector of the Internal Revenue collected all revenue, such as moneys received from the sale or rental of land except that from customs duties and court fees. The Internal Revenue Office was abolished on 4 January 1837 with its business becoming the responsibility of the Colonial Treasurer.

Colonial governments also raised money from fees on wills and stamp duty, which is a tax imposed on certain kinds of documents. In 1880, the Colony of Tasmania imposed a tax on earnings received from the profits of public companies.

Income taxes were introduced in the late 19th century in a few of the colonies before Federation. In 1884, a general tax on income was introduced in South Australia, and in 1895 income tax was introduced in New South Wales at the rate of six pence in the pound, or 2.5%. Federal income tax was first introduced in 1915, in order to help fund Australia's war effort in the First World War. Between 1915 and 1942, income taxes were levied at both the state and federal level.

The Taxation Administration Act 1953 was assented to on 4 March 1953.

In 1972, the government of William McMahon appointed the NSW Supreme Court judge Kenneth Asprey to conduct a full and wide-ranging review of the tax system. Although controversial when completed for the Whitlam Government in 1975, the Asprey report on taxation has acted "as a guide and inspiration to governments and their advisers for the following 25 years." The main recommendations of the report have all been implemented and are today part of Commonwealth taxation in Australia.

On 20 September 1985, Capital gains tax was introduced. The GST replaced the older wholesale sales tax in 2000. In July 2001, the Financial Institutions Duty was abolished. Between 2002 and 2005, Bank Account Debits Tax was abolished.

On 1 July 2012 the Federal government introduced a Carbon price, requiring large emitters of carbon dioxide to purchase permits, the government also introduced a Minerals Resource Rent Tax, originally called a resources 'super profits' tax in the Henry Tax Report. The revenue from the carbon pricing regime was used to reduce income tax by increasing the tax-free threshold and increase pensions and welfare payments, as well as introducing compensation for some affected industries. The Carbon Tax and associated Resources Rent tax were repealed in 2014.

The Government has brought back a duty on financial institutions in the form of a 'major bank levy' on the five largest banks in Australia.

In 2021, US President Joe Biden worked with a 130 countries to implement a fixed tax rate of 15% to ensure that big businesses don't try to cheat.

Forms of taxes and excises, both Federal and State

Personal income taxes

Income taxes on individuals are imposed at the federal level. This is the most significant source of revenue in Australia. State governments have not imposed income taxes since World War II.

Personal income taxes in Australia are imposed on the personal income of each person on a progressive basis, with higher rates applying to higher income levels. Unlike some other countries, personal income tax in Australia is imposed on an individual and not on a family unit.

Individuals are also taxed on their share of any partnership or trust profits to which they are entitled for the financial year.

Capital gains tax

Capital Gains Tax (CGT) in the context of the Australian taxation system applies to the capital gain made on disposal of any asset, except for specific exemptions. The most significant exemption is the family home. Rollover provisions apply to some disposals, one of the most significant is transfers to beneficiaries on death, so that the CGT is not a quasi death duty.

CGT operates by having net gains treated as taxable income in the tax year an asset is sold or otherwise disposed of. If an asset is held for at least 1 year then any gain is first discounted by 50% for individual taxpayers, or by 33% for superannuation funds. Net capital losses in a tax year may be carried forward and offset against future capital gains.  However, capital losses cannot be offset against income.

Personal use assets and collectables are treated as separate categories and losses on those are quarantined so they can only be applied against gains in the same category, not other gains. This works to stop taxpayers subsidising hobbies from their investment earnings.

Corporate taxes

A company tax is paid by companies and corporations on its net profit, but the company’s loss is carried forward to the next financial year. Unlike personal income taxes which use a progressive scale, company tax is calculated at a flat rate of 30% (25% for small businesses, which are defined below). Corporate tax is paid on the corporation’s profit at the corporate rate and is generally available for distribution, in addition to any retained earnings it may have carried forward, to shareholders as dividends.

A tax credit (called a franking credit) is available to resident shareholders who receive the dividends to reflect the tax paid by the corporation (a process known as dividend imputation). A withholding tax applies on unfranked dividends paid to non-resident shareholders.

From 2015/16, designated "small business entities" with an aggregated annual turnover threshold of less than $2 million were eligible for a lower tax rate of 28.5%. Since 1 July 2016, small business entities with aggregated annual turnover of less than $10 million have had a reduced company tax rate of 27.5%. From 2017/18, corporate entities eligible for the lower tax rate have been known as "base rate entities". The small business threshold has remained at $10 million since 2017/18; but the base rate entity threshold (the aggregated annual turnover threshold under which entities will be eligible to pay a lower tax rate) has continued to rise until the base rate entities have an annual turnover of $50 million giving a tax rate of 25% to the entities below this threshold.

Trustee liability taxes

Where all or part of the net trust income is distributed to either non-residents or minors, the trustee of that trust is assessed on that share on behalf of the beneficiary. In this case, the beneficiaries must declare that share of net trust income on their individual income tax returns, and also claim a credit for the amount of tax the trustee paid on their behalf.

Where the trust accumulates net trust income, the trustee is assessed on that accumulated income at the highest individual marginal rate.

In both cases the trustee will be issued a notice of assessment subsequent to lodging the trust tax return.

Goods and Services taxes

A goods and services tax (GST) is a value added tax levied by the federal government at 10% on the supply of most goods and services by entities registered for the tax. The GST was introduced in Australia on 1 July 2000 by the then Howard Liberal government. A number of supplies are GST-free (e.g., many basic foodstuffs, medical and educational services, exports), input-taxed (residential accommodation, financial services, etc.), exempt (Government charges) or outside the scope of GST.

The revenue from this tax is distributed to the States.

State governments do not levy any sales taxes though they do impose stamp duties on a range of transactions.

In summary, the GST rate of 10% is charged on most goods and services consumed in Australia. A business which is registered for GST would include the GST in the sale prices it charges. However, a business can claim a credit for the GST paid on business expenses and other inputs (called a GST credit). The business would pay to the Tax Office the difference between GST charged on sales and GST credits.

Two types of sales are treated differently:
 Suppliers of GST-free goods and services will not have to pay GST when they make a sale but they will be entitled to GST credits.
 Suppliers of input taxed goods and services do not have to charge GST on sales but they will not be entitled to claim GST credits from their purchases of inputs.

Property taxes

Local governments are typically funded largely by taxes on land value (council rates) on residential, industrial and commercial properties. In addition, some State governments levy tax on land values for investors and primary residences of high value. The State governments also levy stamp duties on transfers of land and other similar transactions.

Fire Service Levies are also commonly applied to domestic house insurance and business insurance contracts. These levies are required under State Government law to assist in funding the fire services in each State.

Departure tax
The Passenger Movement Charge (PMC) is a fee levied by the Australian government on all passengers departing on international flights or maritime transport. The PMC replaced the departure tax in 1995 and was initially described as a charge to partially offset the cost to government of the provision of passenger facilitation at airports, principally customs, immigration and quarantine functions. It is classified by the International Air Transport Association as a departure tax, rather than an airport charge, as its revenue does not directly contribute to passenger processing at airports or sea ports. Since 2017, the PMC has been a flat rate of A$60 per passenger over 12 years of age, with a few limited exemptions.

Excise taxes

The Federal Government imposes excise taxes on goods such as cigarettes, petrol, and alcohol.  The rates imposed may change in February and August each year in response to changes in the consumer price index.

Fuel taxes in Australia

The excise tax on commonly used fuels in Australia as of October 2018 are as follows:
 A$0.416 per litre on Unleaded Petrol fuel (Includes standard, blended (E10) and premium grades)
 A$0.416 per litre on Diesel fuel (Ultra-low sulphur/Conventional)
 A$0.134 per litre on Liquified petroleum gas used as fuel (Autogas or LPG as it is commonly known in Australia)
 A$0.081 per litre on Ethanol fuel (Can be reduced/removed via Grants)
 A$0.041 per litre on Biodiesel (Can be reduced/removed via Grants)

Note: Petrol used for aviation is taxed at $0.03556 per litre

Luxury Car Tax

Luxury Car Tax is payable by businesses which sell or import luxury cars, where the value of the car is above $66,331, or $75,526 for fuel-efficient cars with a fuel consumption of less than 7L per 100 km.

Customs duties
Customs duties are imposed on many imported goods, such as alcohol, tobacco products, perfume, and other items. Some of these goods can be purchased duty-free at duty-free shops.

Payroll taxes

Payroll taxes in Australia are levied by state governments on employers based on wages paid by them. Payroll tax rates vary between states. Typically, payroll tax applies to wages above the threshold, which also varies. Groups of companies may be taxed as a single entity where their operations are significantly integrated or related. This has significance in the grouping of payroll amounts in determining whether the threshold had been reached.

Current Payroll Tax Rates and Thresholds

Queensland and the Northern Territory payroll tax rates are effective rates on payrolls above $5.5 million and $5.75 million respectively. All other jurisdictions levy marginal rates. Some companies may be eligible for deductions, concessions and exemptions.

Payroll taxes in Australian Capital Territory
From 1 July 2014:
 The rate of payroll tax is 6.85%.
 The annual threshold is $1,850,000.
 The monthly threshold is $154,166.66.

Payroll taxes in New South Wales

From 1 July 2013:
 The rate of payroll tax is 5.45%.
 Medicare payments are up to 12%
 Pension Fund contribution is 9.5%
 The annual threshold is $750,000.
 The monthly threshold is:
 28 days = $57,534
 30 days = $61,644
 31 days = $63,699

Employers, or a group of related businesses, whose total Australian wages exceed the current NSW monthly threshold, are required to pay NSW payroll tax.

Each monthly payment or 'nil' remittance is due seven days after the end of each month or the next business day if the seventh day is a weekend (i.e. August payment is due by 7 September). The annual reconciliation and payment or 'nil' remittance is due by 21 July.

Effective July 2007 – In NSW, payroll tax is levied under the Payroll Tax Act 2007 and administered by the Taxation Administration Act 1996.

Prior to 1 July 2007 – In NSW, payroll tax was levied under the Payroll Tax Act 1971 and administered by the Taxation Administration Act 1996.

Payroll taxes in Northern Territory
From 1 July 2012:
 The rate of payroll tax is 5.50%.
 The annual threshold is $1,500,000.
 The monthly threshold is $125,000.

Payroll taxes in Queensland
Companies or groups of companies that pay $1,100,000 or more a year in Australian wages must pay payroll tax. There are deductions, concessions and exemptions available to those that are eligible.

From 1 July 2012:
 The rate of payroll tax is 4.75%.
 The annual threshold is $1,100,000.
 The monthly threshold is $91,666.

Payroll taxes in South Australia
A Payroll Tax liability arises in South Australia when an employer (or a Group of employers) has a wages bill in excess of $600,000 for services rendered by employees anywhere in Australia if any of those services are rendered or performed in South Australia.

From 1 July 2012:
 The rate of payroll tax is 4.95%.
 The annual threshold is $600,000.
 The monthly threshold is $50,000.

Payroll taxes in Tasmania
From 1 July 2013:
 The rate of payroll tax is 6.1%.
 The annual threshold is $1,250,000.
 The monthly threshold is:
 28 days = $95,890
 30 days = $102,740
 31 days = $106,164

Payroll taxes in Victoria
From 1 July 2014:
 The rate of payroll tax is 4.85% (2.425% for regional employers)
 Medicare payments are up to 12%
 Pension Fund contribution is 9.5%
 The annual threshold is $550,000.
 The monthly threshold is $45,833.

From 1 July 2021:
 The rate of payroll tax is 4.85% (1.2125% for regional employers)
 The annual threshold is $700,000.
 The monthly threshold is $58,333.

Payroll taxes in Western Australia
Payroll tax is a general purpose tax assessed on the wages paid by an employer in Western Australia. The tax is self-assessed in that the employer calculates the liability and then pays the appropriate amount to the Office of State Revenue, by way of a monthly, quarterly or annual return.

From 1 July 2014:
 The rate of payroll tax is 5.5%.
 The annual threshold is $800,000.
 The monthly threshold is $66,667.

On 8 December 2004 new legislation was passed making it mandatory for an employer that has, or is a member of a group that has, an expected payroll tax liability equal to or greater than $100,000 per annum, to lodge and pay their payroll tax return via Revenue Online (ROL). This amendment to the Payroll Tax Assessment Act 2002 was effective 1 July 2006.

Fringe Benefits Tax

Fringe Benefits Tax is the tax applied by the Australian Taxation Office to most, although not all, fringe benefits, which are generally non-cash benefits. Most fringe benefits are also reported on employee payment summaries for inclusion on personal income tax returns that must be lodged annually.

Inheritance tax
There is no inheritance tax in Australia, with all states in Australia abolishing what was known as death duties in 1979 following the lead of the Queensland Government led by Joh Bjelke-Petersen.

Private pensions (known as superannuation in Australia) may be taxed at up to three points, depending on the circumstances: at the point of tribution to a fund, on investment income and at the time benefits are received.
The compulsory nature of Australian Superannuation means that it is sometimes regarded as being similar to social security taxes levied in other nations. This is more frequently the case when comparisons are being made between the tax burden of respective nations.

See also

 Australia Tax
 Bottom of the harbour tax avoidance
 Cherry-picking tax avoidance
 Negative gearing (Australia)
 Office of State Revenue (New South Wales)
 Salary packaging
 Tax file number
 Tax return (Australia)
 Tax Institute (Australia)
 Darwin Rebellion

Tax law:
 Constitutional basis of taxation in Australia
 Bank Notes Tax Act 1910

Related:
 Australian federal budget
 Australian economy

References

Tax Return Perth